Wynyard County is one of the 141 Cadastral divisions of New South Wales. It contains the city of Wagga Wagga. The Murrumbidgee River lies on the northern edge of the county, and the Tumut River on the eastern edge.

Wynyard County was named in honour of Major-General Robert Henry Wynyard (1802-1864).

Parishes within this county
A full list of parishes found within this county; their current LGA and mapping coordinates to the approximate centre of each location is as follows:

References

Counties of New South Wales